The 1990 Rothmans Cup was a one-day International cricket tournament which took place from 1 to 11 March 1990 in New Zealand. The host nation competed against Australia and India. Each side played each other twice before the two with the most points qualified for a place in the final. Australia won the tournament, defeating New Zealand in the final.

Australia were captained by Allan Border, India by Mohammad Azharuddin and New Zealand by John Wright. Martin Crowe replaced Wright as captain in the third and fourth matches, while Geoff Marsh replaced Border in the sixth match.

Matches

Group stage

Final

References

Notes

Sources
 
 Cricket Archive: Rothmans Cup Triangular Series 1989/90
 ESPNCricinfo: Rothmans Cup Triangular Series
 
 

International cricket competitions from 1988–89 to 1991
Rothmans Cup Triangular Series
Rothmans Cup, 1990
Rothmans Cup Triangular Series
New Zealand cricket seasons from 1970–71 to 1999–2000
One Day International cricket competitions